Fuse of Love is the fifth studio album by Japanese recording artist Mai Kuraki. It was released on August 24, 2005, over two years after If I Believe.

Background 
This album is the first to be produced by Kuraki herself.

Nearly five years after its release, the song "Chance for You" was chosen to be the theme song for the movie Soft Boy and a re-arranged "Cinema Version" was digitally released on June 16, 2010.

Commercial performance 
Fuse of Love debuted at #3 with 108,269 copies sold making it Kuraki's first album to not open/peak at number-one on the Oricon albums chart. The album stayed in the top 10 for two weeks and charted for a total of 13 weeks. Fuse of Love was the 81st best selling album of 2005.

Track listing

Charts

Certifications

References

External links 

2005 albums
Mai Kuraki albums
Being Inc. albums
Giza Studio albums
Japanese-language albums
Albums produced by Daiko Nagato